Shamattawa Airport  is located adjacent to Shamattawa, Manitoba, Canada.

Airlines and destinations

References

External links

Certified airports in Manitoba

Transport in Northern Manitoba